Taiteccopsis davisorum is a species of moth of the family Tortricidae. It is found in Nigeria.

The wingspan is about 9.5 mm. The ground colour of the forewings is cream and the submedian interfascia are tinged with pale ferruginous posteriorly and sparsely strigulated with brownish grey. The posterior half of the wing is suffused with brownish and sprinkled and strigulated with brown-grey. The costal strigulae are more cream than the ground colour. The divisions are brownish and markings brownish grey with blackish strigulae and sprinkled with whitish. The hindwings are brownish, but paler basally.

Etymology
The species is named for Don and Mignon Davis who collected the species.

References

Moths described in 2013
Olethreutini